Magno may refer to:

 Magno the Magnetic Man, a fictional superhero originally published by Quality Comics
 Magno (character), a superhero in the post-Zero Hour future of the DC Comics universe
 Rio Magno, a river in Jamaica

People
 Magno (consul 518), Roman Consul in 518
 Stefano Magno (1490–1557), 16th-century Venetian chronicler
 Alex Magno (choreographer), Brazilian Emmy Nominated choreographer and director
 Alex Magno (political scientist), political scientist and academician in the Philippines
 John Magno (born 1963), Canadian businessman from Toronto
 Deedee Magno (born 1975), American actress and singer
 Magno (footballer, born 1974), Magno Mocelin, Brazilian football forward
 Magno (footballer, born 1987), Magno Santos de Almeida, Brazilian football attacking midfielder
 Magno (footballer, born 1988), Magno Batista da Silva, Brazilian football defensive midfielder
 Magno (footballer, born 1993), Magno dos Santos Ribeiro, Brazilian football forward
Magno (wrestler), a Mexican professional wrestler